The 2005–06 Mongolia Hockey League season was the fifteenth season of the Mongolia Hockey League. Baganuur won the championship by defeating Erdenet-Hangardi in the playoff final.

Regular season

Playoffs

Semifinals
Erdenet-Hangardi - Otgon Od Ulaanbaatar 6-4, 6-5
Baganuur - Bilegtkhuu Ulaanbaatar 3-4, 5-2, 7-5

3rd place
Otgon Od Ulaanbaatar - Bilegtkhuu Ulaanbaatar 4-2

Final
Baganuur - Erdenet-Hangardi 6-3

External links
Season on hockeyarchives.info

Mongolia
Mongolia Hockey League seasons
Mon